Taleb Beygi (also Romanized as Ţāleb Beygī, Taleb Baigi, and Ţāleb Bīgī, Tāleb-e Beygī, and Ţāleb-e Bīgī; also known as Ţāleb-e Bagi) is a village in Shurjeh Rural District, in the Central District of Sarvestan County, Fars Province, Iran. At the 2006 census, its population was 727, in 196 families.

References 

Populated places in Sarvestan County